Alun Craig Williams (born 7 June 1985) is a British politician who has served as Parliamentary Private Secretary to the Prime Minister since October 2022. A member of the Conservative Party, he was the Member of Parliament (MP) for Cardiff North from 2015 to 2017, when he was defeated for reelection by Labour's Anna McMorrin. At the 2019 general election, Williams was elected as the MP for Montgomeryshire.

Early life and education 
Williams was born in Welshpool to David and Andrea Williams. He attended Gungrog Road school, Ysgol Maesydre and Welshpool High School.

Parliamentary career 
Williams first stood for office in Cardiff West against the Welsh First Minister Rhodri Morgan in the 2007 National Assembly for Wales election.

Williams had represented Pentyrch ward on City of Cardiff Council from 2008, and unsuccessfully contested the Cardiff South and Penarth by-election in 2012, coming second to Labour's Stephen Doughty. Whilst on the council, he was Chairman of the Economy Committee from 2012 to 2015. He was Director of Cardiff Bus from 2011 to 2015.

In May 2015, he was elected Member of Parliament for the marginal seat of Cardiff North. In July 2015, Williams was elected as a member of the Work and Pensions Select Committee, a position which he held until October 2016. Williams then served as a member of the Welsh Affairs Select Committee and the Scottish Affairs Select Committee.

Williams was opposed to Brexit prior to the 2016 referendum, and consistently voted with the Government Whip. He lost his seat at the June 2017 general election to Labour's Anna McMorrin.

Prior to the 2019 general election, Williams was a Special Adviser to the Secretary of State for Exiting the European Union, Steve Barclay.

In July 2019, Williams was announced as the Conservative candidate for the constituency of Montgomeryshire for the next general election, where the sitting Conservative MP Glyn Davies was standing down. In the general election held in December Williams won the seat with 59% of the vote, and consequently returned to Westminster. He increased the Conservative majority in Montgomeryshire to over 12,000 votes.

Williams was appointed Parliamentary Private Secretary to his former boss, Steve Barclay, the Chief Secretary to the Treasury. Since becoming an MP in 2019, he has also joined the International Trade Select Committee and European Statutory Instruments Committee. In addition, he chairs the All Party Parliamentary Groups on Wales in the World and International Trade and Investment. In 2022 Williams resigned from his position as Parliamentary Private Secretary, losing confidence in the Prime Minister.

It was alleged that Williams was napping on the parliamentary benches in November 2020, and a social media clip suggested that he was not paying attention, or even sleeping. Williams claimed this was due to a partial deafness in one ear, which he confirmed during a speech on the British Sign Language Bill.

Personal life
Williams married Clare Bath in 2013; the couple have one son and one daughter. He lists his recreations in Who's Who as rugby, real ale, walking, Welsh springer spaniels, and being a school governor (primary). He is a member of the Carlton Club, as well as the Cardiff and County Club.

References

External links

Living people
1985 births
People from Welshpool
Members of the Parliament of the United Kingdom for Cardiff constituencies
Conservative Party (UK) MPs for Welsh constituencies
UK MPs 2015–2017
UK MPs 2019–present
Councillors in Cardiff
Parliamentary Private Secretaries to the Prime Minister